Gülcan is a feminine Turkish given name meaning "rose soul". Notable people with the name include:

Gülcan Kamps (born 1982), Turkish-German TV presenter
Gülcan Koca (born 1990), Turkish-Australian footballer
Gülcan Mıngır (born 1989), Turkish middle-distance runner

Turkish feminine given names